Emerging market debt (EMD) is a term used to encompass bonds issued by Less Developed Countries. It does not include borrowing from government, supranational organizations such as the IMF or private sources, though loans that are securitized and issued to the markets would be included. A broader discussion of all types of borrowing by developing countries exists at Developing countries' debt.

Issuance
Emerging market debt is primarily issued by sovereign issuers. Corporate debt does exist in this category, but corporations in developing countries generally tend to borrow from banks and other sources, as public debt issuance requires both sufficiently developed markets and large borrowing needs. Sovereign issuance has historically been primarily issued in foreign currencies (external debt), either US Dollars or Euros (hard currency versus local currency). In recent years the development of pension systems in certain countries has led to increasing issuance in local currencies. 

EMD tends to have a lower credit rating than other sovereign debt because of the increased economic and political risks - where most developed countries are either AAA or AA-rated, most EMD issuance is rated below investment grade, though a few countries that have seen significant improvements have been upgraded to BBB or A ratings, and a handful of lower income countries have reached ratings levels equivalent to more profligate developed countries. In the wake of the credit crunch and the 2010 European sovereign debt crisis, certain emerging market countries have emerged as possibly less prone to default than developed markets.

History
Emerging market debt was historically a small part of bond markets, as primary issuance was limited, data quality was poor, markets were illiquid and crises were a regular occurrence. Since the advent of the Brady Plan in the early 1990s, however, issuance has increased dramatically. The market has continued to be more prone to crises than other debt markets, including the Tequila Crisis in 1994-95, East Asian financial crisis in 1997, 1998 Russian financial crisis and Argentine economic crisis in 2001-02.

Investing in EMD
Investors tend to use mutual funds to invest in EMD, as many individual securities become more illiquid in secondary markets and bid/offer spreads are too wide to actively trade. The dominant market indexes for US-Dollar denominated investments are the JPMorgan EMBI+ Index, JPMorgan EMBI Global Index and JPMorgan EMBI Global Diversified Index. Other banks also provide indexes.

Issuing countries
Countries needing to borrow generally do not do so publicly unless the borrowing is sufficiently large to justify the costs involved. As a result, most small and poor countries are not actually counted as belonging in the EMD universe. Countries currently listed as EMD issuers include

A handful of countries have stopped issuing debt considered to be 'EMD' due to lesser borrowing needs, improved credit quality, or becoming increasingly developed. These include the Czech Republic, India, Kazakhstan, Poland, South Korea and Thailand, among others.

See also
Brady Plan
Developing countries' debt
Asian Bond Markets
Original Sin (economics)
Domestic Liability Dollarization

References

External links
Emerging Markets: Analysis of finance in developing economies

Bonds (finance)